Freestyle skiing has been featured as a sport in the Asian Winter Games since the third winter games in 1996.

Editions

Events

Medal table

Participating nations

List of medalists

References 
Sports123

 
Sports at the Asian Winter Games
Asian Winter Games